Max Studer may refer to:

 Max Studer (triathlete)
 Max Studer (wrestler)